Big Nate: Goes for Broke is a New York Times Bestselling realistic fiction novel by American cartoonist Lincoln Peirce, based on the Big Nate comic strip. It is the fourth book in the Big Nate series, followed by Big Nate: Flips Out, released on March 20, 2012. It is aimed at children aged 8–12. It was published by HarperCollins Publishers

Plot

Nate Wright and his friends start a cartooning club with Mr. Rosa named "The Doodlers". In one of these meetings, an art teacher from PS 38's rival school, Jefferson, visits and showcases some drawings from her class. Nate is immediately angered at the quality of the drawings, as Jefferson is generally better than PS 38 at everything. Later, Mr. Rosa suggests that the club should include more girls and Nate believes they should invite his crush Jenny, to which the others immediately scoff at. Francis proposes they invite Dee Dee, a talkative girl known for being incredibly dramatic and constantly dressing up in costumes, due to her being a good artist. He then shows a poster she drew as proof. Nate reluctantly agrees and sheepishly walks up to Dee Dee while talking to her friends. Nate stumbles on his words and Dee Dee mistakes him for asking her out to the upcoming dance, which she happily accepts. Nate, being unable to decline due to the large group of students surrounding the two egging him on, decides to capitulate. 

On the night of the Dance, Nate picks up Dee Dee, only to be surprised at the tropical fruit arrangement on her head. The two head to the dance, only to be encountered by school bully Randy Betancourt, who Nate humorously implies has no good qualities. Nate goes to change into a swim suit, only for Randy to steal his clothes, leaving him in nothing but underwear. Nate flags Dee Dee down, and tells her his situation. She then runs and gets him a backup set of clothes; a grass skirt. Nate wears it to his chagrin and imagines the wave of embarrassment he'll receive on the dance floor. Instead, the complete opposite happens, as the students are impressed by his odd attire. After several minutes of dancing, water starts to drip from the gym ceiling, as the sprinklers malfunction. Coach Johnson then yells through a megaphone for everyone to go home. 

On a hill, Nate and Francis are preparing to sled down when Teddy arrives with a Supa Snow Tube, which he spent his garage shoveling money on. The boys take turns on the tube, having a ton of fun due to its speed, when a couple of boys from Jefferson show up. Their leader, Nolan, takes interest in the boys and steals their tube. They then try to sled down the hill with all of them piled on at once. As Teddy fears, the snow tube is crushed and springs a large leak, deflating it. Nolan and his friends then take off, laughing at the distraught Teddy. Nate promises to Teddy that his dad can suture up and re-inflate the tube. 

On their way to Nate's house, the boys spot construction workers at PS 38, one of whom is Dee Dee's father. They ask him what has happened, and he explains that the sprinkler malfunction caused severe water damage in the gym, and much of it needs to be refurbished. The boys ask where they will go to school, and Dee Dee's father tells them they won't be able to, since the school will be closed for a few weeks. Excited at this news, the boys rush home and happily inform Nate's dad, Marty, that they've gotten a surprise break. Marty tells them he heard about this in an email, and informs the boys they might want to read it themselves, to their confusion. After reading the email, they discover in horror that PS 38 is being temporarily being relocated to Jefferson until the damage is fixed. Knowing that every student will be constantly made fun of at the school, the boys become enraged.

On their first day of school at Jefferson, Nate and friends are awestruck at the niceties of Jefferson, noting the statuesque mascot and nice hallways and bathrooms. Hoping they don't have to go to the same classes as Jefferson kids, the kids are happy to hear from Principal Nicholas that they will be separated, only to immediately be demoralized when they see they will be learning in mobile trailer classrooms. At their first lunch, the boys mock a Jefferson student for referring to the cafeteria as "a foodcourt", saying everything at the school is fancy. They are then shocked to find the kid wasn't just being upscale, and that the cafeteria is a real food court with actually good food. Before they can indulge in the amenities, Nate spots Nolan picking on Chad for being short, having stolen a seat ring from him (which Chad needs due to having injuring himself). Nate confronts Nolan, who proceeds to retort by mocking Nate about Teddy's ruined snow tube. Nolan than throws the ring like a frisbee and Nate chases it on top of a table, only to slip and fall on his wrist, breaking it. 

Nate shows up the next day with his wrist in a cast, calling it an "embarrassing injury". He is heartbroken since the cast is on his right wrist, meaning he can't draw or write with it. During the cartooning club, Nate tries and fails to draw multiple times, and finally gives up. He originally had plans to submit a Dr Cesspool comic strip to a contest, but is now unable to since it is not finished. Dee Dee volunteers to finish it for him, creating a composite piece. Nate is very reluctant since Dee Dee can be odd at times, and doesn't want her to mess up his comic. Mr. Rosa, liking the idea, sides with Dee Dee and tells Nate to give her the comic, which he later does. 

At one point, Nate proclaims that Jefferson is unbeatable, Dee Dee contests this opinion, saying "everyone has an Achilles Heel". Nate later learns that the phrase means a weakness that can be exploited and completely derail a person. After more days of going to school at Jefferson, Nate and a few friends take refuge in a storage closet, where they find an old cavalier mascot and some other memorabilia. Later, a basketball game between PS 38 and Jefferson takes place. Nate is irritated because he can't play due to his injury and that Dee Dee showed up in a scary bobcat costume. The game ends with Jefferson winning 129 - 43 with PS 38 making multiple screw ups during the game. The boys leave the game enraged at such a killing defeat. However, Nate gets the idea to challenge the Jefferson kids and Nolan to a snow sculpting contest, calling it the "Snowdown". Mr. Rosa overhears this and volunteers to judge them with the Jefferson art teacher. 

On the day of the Snowdown, the PS 38 kids get to work building their sculpture and watch the Jefferson kids set up a large tarp and drag in something wrapped in blankets. They dismiss this and proceed to build a statue of Achilles with an arrow in his heel (in reference to Dee Dee's remark). The Jefferson kids reveal their sculpture to be a replica of their mascot, the cavalier, which shocks everyone including the judges due to its lifelike nature. However, Mr. Rosa, puzzled by the statue, walks over and brushes at it, revealing the metal suit of armor from the storage room underneath. Due to the lack of creativity in simply covering a statue with snow, the judges announce PS 38 to be the winners of the Snowdown, finally granting the school a win over Jefferson. 

Nate and friends return to PS 38, still celebrating their win. They then get further good news when Mr Rosa reveals that Nate and Dee Dee won 3rd place for their joint Dr Cesspool comic, only being beaten by high schoolers. They are then overjoyed to hear Jefferson never made it on the ballot, having only submitted singular drawings. Nate then concludes his cast made him lucky in by letting Dee Dee work on his comic, to which she returns by kindly signing it.

Reception
Critical reception for Big Nate Goes for Broke has been positive. The Horn Book Guide rated the book favorably, stating "Nate's enthusiastic nature, his amusing mishaps, and Peirce's inviting comic style will keep fans happy." Commonsensemedia gave the book three out of five stars, writing "Creative underdogs win big in fun comic novel."

References

2012 American novels
American children's novels
2012 children's books
HarperCollins books